Kerstin Isabella Hökmark (born Lehander, previously Jernback, on 22 June 1962 in Nyköping) is a Swedish politician of the Moderate Party.  She was a member of the Riksdag 2006-2014 and from 2015 to 2018.

She is married to Swedish MEP Gunnar Hökmark.

References

External links 
Isabella Jernbeck at the Riksdag website

Members of the Riksdag from the Moderate Party
Living people
1962 births
Women members of the Riksdag
21st-century Swedish women politicians